is an international acoustical consultancy firm. In Japan they have been involved in the design of over seventy concert halls, including the Suntory Hall, Sapporo Concert Hall, Muza Kawasaki Symphony Hall, Kyoto Concert Hall and Hyogo Performing Arts Center; other projects have included the Supreme Court, Tokyo and the sound system for the New National Theatre, Tokyo. Outside Japan they have consulted on the Walt Disney Concert Hall, Polish National Radio Symphony Orchestra in Katowice, the Danish Radio Concert Hall, Helsinki Music Centre, Mariinsky Concert Hall and Opera House, Elbphilharmonie, Taichung Metropolitan Opera House, Bing Concert Hall, and Philharmonie de Paris.

See also
 Acoustical engineering
 Yasuhisa Toyota
 Vineyard style (architecture)

References

External links
 

Japanese acoustical engineers
Service companies based in Tokyo
Japanese companies established in 1971
1971 establishments in Japan